Eccellenza Veneto is the regional Eccellenza football division for clubs in Veneto, Italy. It is competed amongst 32 teams, in two different groups (A and B). The winners of the Groups are promoted to Serie D. The club who finishes second also have the chance to gain promotion, they are entered into a national play-off which consists of two rounds.

Champions
Here are the past champions of the Veneto Eccellenza, organised into their respective group.

Group A

1991–92 Contarina
1992–93 Donada
1993–94 Luparense
1994–95 Lendinarese
1995–96 Giorgianna
1996–97 Bassano Virtus
1997–98 Montecchio Maggiore
1998–99 Chioggia Sottomarina
1999–2000 Tezze sul Brenta
2000–01 Cologna Veneta
2001–02 Lonigo
2002–03 Sambonifacese
2003–04 Union Vigontina
2004–05 Este
2005–06 Virtus Verona
2006–07 Domegliara
2007–08 Somma
2008–09 Villafranca
2009–10 Legnago Salus
2010–11 Sarego
2011–12 Trissino
2012–13 Marano
2013–14 Villafranca
2014–15 Campodarsego
2015–16 Adriese
2016–17 Ambrosiana
2017–18 Cartigliano
2018–19 Vigasio
2019–20 Sona
2020–21 San Martino Speme
2021–22 Villafranca

Group B

1991–92 Miranese
1992–93 Montebelluna
1993–94 Schio
1994–95 Mestre
1995–96 Portogruaro
1996–97 Martellago
1997–98 Portogruaro
1998–99 La Marenese 
1999–2000 Bessica
2000–01 Cordignano
2001–02 Conegliano Calcio
2002–03 Gemeaz Cusin San Polo
2003–04 Montebelluna
2004–05 Eurocalcio
2005–06 Union Quinto
2006–07 San Donà
2007–08 Sagittaria Julia
2008–09 Adriese
2009–10 Opitergina
2010–11 Delta
2011–12 Clodiense
2012–13 Vittorio Veneto
2013–14 Union Pro Mogliano
2014–15 Calvi Noale
2015–16 Pievigina
2016–17 Liventina
2017–18 Sandonà
2018–19 Luparense
2019–20 San Giorgio Sedico
2020–21 Spinea
2021–22 Portogruaro

References

External links
Some Club Histories In the League

Sport in Veneto
Ven
Football clubs in Italy
Sports leagues established in 1991
1991 establishments in Italy
Association football clubs established in 1991